Introvertocystis is an extinct genus of acritarchs. Introvertocystis rangiaotea is from the Late Cretaceous (Cenomanian–Turonian) Tupuangi Formation of the Chatham Islands, New Zealand.

References 

 John O. Corliss (1984). The kingdom Protista and its 45 phyla, BioSystems, 1984

External links 
 

Acritarch genera
Natural history of New Zealand
Cretaceous life